Guimiliau is a commune in the Finistère department of Brittany in north-western France.

It is noted for the Guimiliau Parish close. It should not be confused with the neighbouring commune and village of Lampaul-Guimiliau.

Population
Inhabitants of Guimiliau are called in French Guimiliens.

Local Saints
Guimiliau, or Gwimilio in Breton, is named after St Miliau. The name simply means town or settlement (Breton: gwic) of Milio. According to legend, Miliau was a good and just Breton prince, put to death in a dynastic quarrel in the 6th or 9th century.

Guimiliau is also famous as the reputed birthplace of St Hervé, a 6th-century ascetic, who is one of the most popular Breton saints.

Parish close

Parish closes are a distinctive feature of Breton culture in the historic Léon diocese, in which Guimiliau stands. As the name suggests, a close is a completely enclosed church yard, usually with a commanding entrance arch. Sacred enclosures were a feature of Celtic religion even before the arrival of Christianity. Parish closes today form the foci for pardons, the annual Breton pilgrimage festivals, which can attract thousands of worshippers.

The parish close of Guimiliau is situated at the upper end of the main village street, with the entrance dominating the village.

The calvary  or crucifix is the centre piece of the church yard, surrounded by a fine and complex retelling of the Passion in statuary. See Calvary at Guimiliau

The church contains many fine examples of polychrome sculpture from the sixteenth century onwards, including several large retables. There is also a fine octagonal baptistery, a carved pulpit and a collection of banners used especially in religious processions at pardons.

Gallery

See also
Communes of the Finistère department
List of the works of the Maître de Plougastel

References

External links

Mayors of Finistère Association 

Communes of Finistère